State Route 285 (SR 285) is a  long state highway in eastern Ohio. The route runs from SR 821 in Caldwell, Ohio, the county seat of Noble County, to US 22 in Madison Township, Guernsey County.

Route description
No segment of SR 285 is included within the National Highway System.

History
SR 285 was first designated in 1931 as a gravel spur route from SR 265 near Lore City to Senecaville. Within one year, the route was extended north via a dirt road to US 40 in Old Washington. By 1935, the route was extended to its current northern terminus at US 22. SR 285 was extended to its current southern terminus in Caldwell (at the time, US 21) by 1937. No major changes have occurred to the route since that time.

Major intersections

References

285
Transportation in Noble County, Ohio
Transportation in Guernsey County, Ohio